Pristimantis malkini is a species of frog in the family Strabomantidae.
It is found in Brazil, Colombia, Ecuador, and Peru.
Its natural habitats are tropical moist lowland forests, swamps, and rivers.

References

malkini
Amphibians of Brazil
Amphibians of Colombia
Amphibians of Ecuador
Amphibians of Peru
Amphibians described in 1980
Taxonomy articles created by Polbot